Liolaemus austromendocinus, the Austromendocino tree iguana, is a species of lizard in the family  Liolaemidae. It is native to Argentina.

References

austromendocinus
Reptiles described in 1974
Reptiles of Argentina
Taxa named by José Miguel Alfredo María Cei